Wolfgang Dourado was a former attorney general, and later Chief Justice, of Zanzibar.

After the 1964 Zanzibar Revolution, Dourado chose to remain behind and support the Revolutionary Government as other Goans fled.

References

Zanzibari politicians
Zanzibari people of Goan descent
Living people
Zanzibari judges
Zanzibari people of Indian descent
Chief justices
Tanzanian politicians of Indian descent
Year of birth missing (living people)